Hahle is a river of Thuringia and of Lower Saxony, Germany. It joins the Rhume in Gieboldehausen.

See also
List of rivers of Thuringia
List of rivers of Lower Saxony

References

Rivers of Thuringia
Rivers of Lower Saxony
Rivers of Germany